The John E. Fogarty International Center was founded in 1968 by US President Lyndon Johnson at the National Institutes of Health to support international medical and behavioral research and to train international researchers.

History
On July 1, 1968, President Lyndon Johnson issued an Executive Order establishing the John E. Fogarty International Center for Advanced Study in the Health Sciences at the National Institutes of Health (NIH) in order to support international medical and behavioral research and to train international researchers. In March 2017, the Trump Administration proposed cuts to the NIH budget, including elimination of the Fogarty Center, saving $69 million.

Directors 
Past Directors from 1968 - present

References

Fogarty International Center
Medical research institutes
International medical and health organizations
1968 establishments in Maryland
Research institutes established in 1968
Organizations based in Maryland
Bethesda, Maryland
Research institutes in Maryland